Lesotho competed at the 2016 Summer Olympics in Rio de Janeiro, Brazil, from 5 to 21 August 2016. This was the nation's eleventh appearance at the Summer Olympics, with the exception of the 1976 Summer Olympics in Montreal, because of its partial support to the African boycott.

Lesotho National Olympic Committee sent the nation's largest delegation to the Games since 1996. A total of eight athletes, seven men and one woman, were selected to the Lesotho team to compete only in athletics, boxing, and mountain biking (the nation's Olympic sporting debut in Rio de Janeiro). Track sprinter Mosito Lehata led the Lesotho delegation as the lone returning Olympian from London 2012 and the nation's flag bearer in the opening ceremony. Lesotho, however, has yet to win its first ever Olympic medal.

Athletics (track and field)
 
Lesotho athletes have so far achieved qualifying standards in the following athletics events (up to a maximum of 3 athletes in each event):

Track & road events

Boxing

Lesotho has entered one boxer to compete only in the men's bantamweight division into the Olympic boxing tournament. Inkululeko Suntele had claimed his Olympic spot with a semifinal victory at the 2016 African Qualification Tournament in Yaoundé, Cameroon. Meanwhile, flyweight boxer Moroke Mokhotho had received a spare Olympic berth as the next highest-ranked boxer, not yet qualified, in the same meet, due to South Africa's decision not to accept spots through the continental qualifier.

Cycling

Mountain biking
Lesotho has received an invitation from Tripartite Commission to send a mountain biker for the men's Olympic cross-country race, signifying the nation's Olympic debut in the sport.

References

External links
 
 

Nations at the 2016 Summer Olympics
2016
Olympics